Arctostaphylos nummularia subsp. mendocinoensis, commonly known as pygmy manzanita, is a subspecies of manzanita. It is endemic to Mendocino County, California and Sonoma County, California, where it is known from only one occurrence in the pygmy forests along the coastline.

Description
This is a small, mat-forming shrub growing in low mounds less than half a meter tall. It has red, shreddy bark and bristles along its smaller branches. The leaves are dark green, shiny, convex, and hairless, and rarely more than a centimeter long. The inflorescence is a dense cluster of urn-shaped flowers with four tiny lobes at the mouth. The fruit is a cylindrical drupe only a few millimeters long, containing four minute seeds.

References

External links
Jepson Manual Treatment
USDA Plants Profile
Photo gallery

nummularia mendocinoensis
Endemic flora of California
Natural history of the California Coast Ranges
Natural history of Mendocino County, California
Natural history of Sonoma County, California
Plants described in 1989
Flora without expected TNC conservation status